The Autons are an artificial life form from the British science fiction television series Doctor Who and adversaries of the Doctor. They were originally created by scriptwriter Robert Holmes for Jon Pertwee's first serial as the Doctor, Spearhead from Space (1970), and were the first monsters to be presented in colour on the series.

They returned for the following season's Terror of the Autons (1971), which also introduced the character of the Master, but they did not appear again in the original series. Holmes intended to feature the Autons for season 23 of Doctor Who in 1986 in a story entitled Yellow Fever and How to Cure It, which featured the Master and the Rani, but it was abandoned due to the programme being put on an 18th-month hiatus.

Autons are essentially life-sized plastic dummies, automatons animated by the Nestene Consciousness, an extraterrestrial, disembodied gestalt intelligence which first arrived on Earth in hollow plastic meteorites. Their name comes from Auto Plastics, the company that was infiltrated by the Nestenes and subsequently manufactured their Auton shells in Spearhead From Space.

Autons conceal deadly weapons within their hands, which can kill or vaporise their targets. The typical Auton does not look particularly realistic, resembling a mannequin, being robotic in its movements and mute. However, more sophisticated Autons can be created, which look and act human except for a slight plastic sheen to the skin and a flat-sounding voice. In Series 5 of the relaunched Doctor Who series, they are shown as being able to create fully lifelike human replicas, able to fool other humans.

History
The Nestenes are among the oldest beings in the Doctor Who universe, described as creatures which existed in the "Dark Times", along with the Racnoss, Great Vampires and Carrionites. Eventually, they sought to invade the Earth (in Spearhead from Space), using more human-looking Autons to replace key government figures, although these plans were thwarted by UNIT with the help of the Doctor, who also destroyed their invasion form, a multi-tentacled cephalopod.

The Nestenes subsequently returned in the first serial of Pertwee's second year as the Doctor, Terror of the Autons, which also featured the introduction of the Master. In this attempt, the Nestenes also made use of more mundane, everyday plastic objects, animating plastic toys, inflatable chairs and artificial flowers in addition to their Auton servants. The Doctor convinced the Master that the Nestenes were too dangerous to be reliable allies, and they reversed the radio beam the invasion force was coming in on, sending it back into space. This would be The Nestenes and the Autons final appearance in Doctor Who's original run. They would not return again until the episode Rose in 2005.

Early drafts of The Five Doctors (1983) featured a scene where Sarah Jane Smith encountered some Autons and is rescued by the Third Doctor, but it was dropped before filming for reasons of time and expense. A third appearance was planned for the aborted 1986 season during Colin Baker's tenure as the Doctor, but never materialized. Titled Yellow Fever and How to Cure It, it was supposed to be set in Singapore, with appearances by the Rani and the Master. The story, which was to be scripted by the veteran writer Robert Holmes, only exists in outline form.

Although the Autons only appeared in two serials during the original television series run, they remain one of the more memorable monsters associated with the Jon Pertwee years as well as Doctor Who as a whole. The image of store mannequins coming to life in Spearhead from Space, in full colour and shooting people down in the street, is one of the series' iconic moments and is often cited as an example of the series' ability to make everyday things terrifying. The use of even more ordinary objects in Terror of the Autons  — including the unmasking of a police officer as an Auton  — caused public controversy about whether the programme was too frightening for children. The story also featured in a discussion in the House of Lords, where Baroness Bacon expressed worries about it being too frightening even for older children.

When the series was revived in 2005, producer and writer Russell T Davies chose the Autons as the first monster to be featured. The Nestenes infiltrated Earth once more, using warp shunt technology, in the opening episode of the 2005 series. In "Rose", it was revealed that the Nestenes lost their food supply in a war when their protein planets rotted. Their intent was to overthrow and destroy the human race, as Earth was ideal for their consumption needs, being filled with smoke, oil and various pollutants. They were eventually destroyed when Rose spilled a vial of the Doctor's "anti-plastic" solution into the vat of molten plastic which housed the main bulk of the Consciousness, causing it to explode. (The episode never mentioned "Autons" by name other than in the credits, but the Nestene Consciousness was specifically identified.)

"Rose" also featured an Auton facsimile that could change the shape of its features and limbs, and established that the Nestenes animate the Autons by means of telepathic projection. When duplicated, the originals are kept alive to maintain the copy (this is also seen in Spearhead from Space). It is not yet clear if the war mentioned was also the motivation behind their earlier invasions or a recent development, but it is likely to be the Time War that is featured in subsequent episodes of the series.

The Autons appeared in a segment of the 2006 series episode "Love & Monsters". The sequence, specifically filmed for the episode, was a flashback to the climactic events of "Rose".

The Autons returned in the 2010 episode "The Pandorica Opens", allying with the Atraxi, Blowfish, Chelonians, Daleks, Drahvins, Draconians, Sontarans, Cybermen, Haemogoth, Judoon, Slitheen, Silurians, Sycorax, Terileptils, Hoix, Roboforms, Uvodni, Zygons and Weevils to trap the Eleventh Doctor. The Autons in this episode were programmed to believe they were the soldiers of a Roman legion, among them Rory Williams, using the memories of Amy Pond. They were very realistic and far more sophisticated than the average Auton, and their hands contained futuristic laser guns rather than projectile weapons. As in the 2005 appearance, the name "Auton" was not used in dialogue; the phrase "Nestene duplicate" was introduced here to describe the copy of Rory. Due to the influences of the cracks in time, the Rory copy possessed the personality of the real Rory and helped save the universe. The Rory duplicate survived on Earth from A.D. 102 to 1996, demonstrating that Autons can have a long lifespan.

Other appearances
The Nestenes have also appeared in the Doctor Who spin-off novels (which linked the Consciousness with the Great Old Ones of the Cthulhu Mythos, in particular as an offspring of Shub-Niggurath).

In the Sixth Doctor novel Business Unusual by Gary Russell (which gave Melanie Bush a belated introduction story), the Nestenes used computer games and plastic toys in another bid for world conquest. In Synthespians™ by Craig Hinton, a far-future television station's artificial actors were not what they seemed. This novel also featured the Time Lords launching an assault on the Nestene homeworld Polymos, which may or may not be connected to the war mentioned in "Rose".

In 2008, the Eighth Doctor and Lucie Miller encounter Autons in the audio Brave New Town, these Autons being part of an old Soviet program to infiltrate Britain during the Cold War before the collapse of the Soviet Union left the Autons stuck in a loop in the fake British town created for the spies, eventually developing independence.

A Tenth Doctor novel, Autonomy, was released in September 2009 featuring the Autons.

In the Doctor Who Annual 2006, an article written by Russell T Davies mentions the loss of the Nestene Consciousness's planets during the Time War, and states that it "found itself mutating under temporal stress". This may be a reference to the difference between the portrayal of the Consciousness in Spearhead from Space and "Rose".

In the late 1990s, BBV released a trilogy of made-for-video films, titled Auton, Auton 2: Sentinel and Auton 3. These stories featured UNIT battling the Consciousness. In the first film, a Nestene energy unit and several Autons captured by UNIT in Spearhead from Space are accidentally reactivated. In the sequels, the escaped Autons attempt to awaken several dormant Nestenes put in place since before the development of human civilization. Though BBV was licensed to use the Nestenes, Autons and UNIT by the writers who created them, as with all spin-off productions the canonicity of these films is unclear.

In the first series of the televised Dead Ringers, in a sketch with Jon Culshaw visiting the London Eye (calling it an Interstitial Time Delay Helix) in the persona of the Fourth Doctor, he humorously accused two tourists: "You are Autons from the planet Tosos!"

In 2006, a sketch on The Charlotte Church Show showed the Doctor examining the inner thigh of a scantily clad female mannequin; when confronted by Church (playing his companion), he claimed that he thought it was an Auton.

The Autons appear as sketches in John Smith's A Journal of Impossible Things in the episode "Human Nature".

They appeared in issue 15 of Doctor Who – Battles in Time as the main theme of the issue.

"Autonomous" Autons, which had a piece of Nestene Consciousness inside them and developed personalities when separated from the control unit, were featured in the 2008 Eighth Doctor audio story Brave New Town.

The Autons also appeared in the Doctor Who Level “The Dalek Extermination of Earth” in Lego Dimensions. They appear when the player time travels to Central London in 2015 using the TARDIS, as when the player destroys three purple rocks to get a Minikit, whenever the player destroys one, the Autons come to life out the window and attack the player.

The Autons are also mentioned in the series 12 episode Praxeus.

Other uses
 In the film Alien Resurrection (1997) when revealed as being a robot, the character Annalee Call is noted by another character to be "an Auton, a robot designed by other robots."
 In the book Voyage of the Shadowmoon, the term auton is used to describe self-contained autonomous magical entities, similar to the manner of homunculi.
 In Vernor Vinge's book Marooned in Realtime, flying personal autons, autonomous robotic devices, serve the "High-Techs" as bodyguards or sensory enhancement.

See also
 List of Doctor Who robots
 List of Doctor Who universe creatures and aliens

References

External links
 

Doctor Who races
Fictional robots
Fictional avatars
Fictional dolls and dummies